Love.net is a 2011 Bulgarian drama film directed by Ilian Djevelekov. The film features top Bulgarian actors Hristo Shopov, Vladimir Penev, Zahari Baharov, Lilia Maraviglia, Koyna Ruseva, Diana Dobreva, Dilyana Popova. It is also the first movie appearance of British rock and roll and blues vocalist John Lawton known for his work with Lucifer's Friend, Uriah Heep and the Les Humphries Singers. Love.net is a film about "love at first virtual sight" directed by Ilian Djevelekov. It is produced by the Bulgarian company Miramar Film, and is written by Ilian Djevelekov, Matey Konstantinov, and Nelly Dimitrova. Djevelekov is known for directing one of the most successful recent Bulgarian movies "Zift".

The film won three awards at the 2011 Bulgarian National Film Festival, including Best First Feature Film for Ilian Djevelekov.

Cast
 Hristo Shopov as Filip Bogatev
 Zachary Baharov as Andrey Bogatev
 Lilia Maraviglia as Mila Bogateva
 Koyna Ruseva as Emilia
 Diana Dobreva as Joana
 Dilyana Popova as Niki
 John Lawton as John Johnson
 Lora Cheshmedjieva as Devora
 Yordanka Kuzmanova as Dora
 Vladimir Penev as The Chief
 Teo Avramov as Toni Bogatev

Casting
Ilian Djevelekov came up with the idea for Love.net in 2004. Before developing the script, the team contacted the owners of Elmaz, the largest Bulgarian dating site, who agreed to cooperate with them for the unique movie project. In December 2007 and January 2008 every member of Elmaz had the opportunity to submit to the screenwriters of Love.net their most interesting online dating stories; a total of 7 346 stories were submitted, with the directing team being able to draw upon them for their film.

Awards
2010 - Moscow International Film Festival
Nominated - Official Out of Competition Section
2011 - Bulgarian Feature Film Festival Golden Rose
Won - Best Screenplay – Nelly Dimitrova, Matey Konstantinov, Ilian Djevelekov 
Won - Best Actress – Lilia Maraviglia 
Won - Debut Award – Ilian Djevelekov 
2011 - Bratislava International Film Festival
Nominated - Main Competition 
2011 - Kolkata International Film Festival
Nominated - International cinema
2011 - Bahamas International Film Festival
Nominated - Main competition
2011 - Bulgarian Film Academy Awards
Won - Best Director – Ilian Djevelekov
Won - Best Director of Photography – Emil Christov (b.a.c.)
Won - Best Production Designer – Georgi Dimitrov
Won - Best Editor – Alexandra Fuchanska
Nominated - Best Picture
Nominated - Best Actress – Lilia Maraviglia
Nominated - Best Screenplay – Nelly Dimitrova, Matey Konstantinov, Ilian Djevelekov
Nominated - Best Original Score – Petko Manchev
Nominated - Best Costume Designer – Kristina Tomova, Sylvia Vladimirova
2012 - Romania International Film Festival
Nominated - Main competition
2012 - Cyprus International Film Festival
Nominated - Main competition

References

External links
 

2011 films
2011 directorial debut films
2011 drama films
2010s Bulgarian-language films
Bulgarian drama films
Films shot in Bulgaria